Oestlundia is a genus of orchid within the subtribe Laeliinae.  Its component species are found from Mexico to Venezuela.

Taxonomic history 
Encyclia sect. Oestlundia was published in 1971 by Dressler and Pollard, before the genus Encyclia was accepted.  In 2001, Higgins removed this taxon from the genus Epidendrum and elevated it to generic rank, removing E. subulatifolium in the process.

Acceptance 
On October 28, 2009, the World Checklist (WCSP) stated that this name was accepted, the World Checklist also states that the independence of this genus is accepted in Epidendroideae (Part One). Genera Orchidacearum 4 (2001).

Species (and synonymy) 
The World Checklist lists four species, all published together with the genus:

 Oestlundia cyanocolumna = Epidendrum cyanocolumna or Encyclia cyanocolumna
 Oestlundia distantiflora = Epidendrum distantiflorum or Encyclia distantiflora
 Oestlundia luteorosea = Epidenrum luteoroseum, Encyclia luteorosea, Epidendrum lineare Ruiz & Pav. (1798) nom. illeg., Encyclia linearis, or Epidendrum seriatum
 Oestlundia tenuissima = Epidenrum tenuissimum or Encyclia tenuissima

References

External links 
 Pictures of Oestlundia cyanocolumna can be found at
https://www.flickr.com/photos/ericinsf/713395864/ and at 
https://www.flickr.com/photos/ericinsf/2636090301/in/set-72157605941489835/
 A picture of Oestlundia luteorosea can be found at http://www.orchidstudium.com/Estrangeiras/Oestlundia.html

Laeliinae genera
Laeliinae